Renita Andreevna Grigorieva (13 July 1931 – 19 January 2021) was a Russian director, actress, writer, and screenwriter of both documentary and feature films. She was a 1983 laureate of the USSR State Prize.

Biography
She was born in Moscow to Andrei Semyonovich Shamshin (1903–1972), a scientist-agronomist, and Nina Vasilievna Popova (1908–1994), a Soviet party and social activist.

References

External links

Russian film directors
1931 births
2021 deaths